Lichenopeltella rangiferinae is a species of fungus belonging to the class Dothideomycetes. It was discovered growing on Cladonia rangiferina in Hrútey near Blönduós, Iceland and subsequently described as new to science in 2011.

References

Dothideomycetes
Fungi described in 2011
Fungi of Iceland